Tulki Tappeh (also Romanized as Tūlkī Tappeh and Toolki Tapeh; also known as Tolkī Tappeh, Tork Tappeh, Tūlkī, and Turki Tepe) is a village in Sardrud-e Sofla Rural District, Sardrud District, Razan County, Hamadan Province, Iran. At the 2006 census, its population was 451, in 99 families.

References 

Populated places in Razan County